Portia Lee James DeGeneres (born Amanda Lee Rogers; 31 January 1973), known professionally as Portia de Rossi, is an Australian-American former actress. She played Nelle Porter on the American drama series Ally McBeal (1998–2002), for which she won a Screen Actors Guild Award, Lindsay Bluth Fünke on the American television sitcom Arrested Development (2003–2006, 2013, 2018–2019), and Elizabeth North on the American political thriller series Scandal (2014–2017). She is the founder and CEO of the art company General Public.

She also portrayed Olivia Lord on the American television drama series Nip/Tuck (2007–2009) and Veronica Palmer on the American television sitcom Better Off Ted (2009–2010). De Rossi is married to comedian, actress, and television host Ellen DeGeneres.

Early life 
Portia de Rossi was born Amanda Lee Rogers in Horsham, Victoria, Australia, the daughter of Margaret, a medical receptionist, and Barry Rogers. Her father died when she was nine years old. She grew up in Grovedale, a suburb of Geelong, Victoria, and modelled for print and TV commercials as a child. In 1988, at age 15, she adopted the name Portia de Rossi. In 2005, she said that she had done so to reinvent herself, using the given name of Portia, a character from William Shakespeare's The Merchant of Venice, and an Italian last name. She was educated at Geelong Grammar School and the University of Melbourne, where she studied law.

Career 

De Rossi's first significant role was as a young and impressionable maid in the Australian 1994 film Sirens. Soon afterward, she moved to Los Angeles and won guest roles on several TV shows and a permanent role in Nick Freno: Licensed Teacher, before landing a part in the film Scream 2. During her time in the United States, de Rossi worked to drop her Australian accent.

De Rossi garnered international attention when she joined the main cast of Ally McBeal in 1998, playing lawyer Nelle Porter. She remained with the show until its end in 2002. In 2001, she starred in Who Is Cletis Tout? alongside Christian Slater. From 2003 to 2006, de Rossi starred as Lindsay Bluth Fünke on Fox Television's Arrested Development. She next portrayed John F. Kennedy, Jr.'s wife, Carolyn Bessette-Kennedy, in the made-for-TV movie America's Prince: The John F. Kennedy Jr. Story in 2003. That same year, she portrayed an Australian reporter who inspires a protest against Frank Sinatra during a concert tour in The Night We Called It a Day.

In 2005 de Rossi portrayed Zela, a fortune-teller, in the Wes Craven thriller Cursed. From 2007 to 2008, de Rossi appeared in Nip/Tuck's fifth season as Julia McNamara's girlfriend, Olivia Lord.

In 2009 and 2010, de Rossi played the high-strung and controlling Veronica Palmer on the ABC show Better Off Ted. In 2011, she appeared in Better Off Ted cast member Malcolm Barrett's music video for "Revenge of the Nerds", spoofing her character in a cameo alongside other cast members of the series.

She ranked 69th in Stuff Magazine's 100 Sexiest Women, 31 in Femme Fatales''' Sexiest Women of 2003 list, and 24 in Maxim's 100 Sexiest Women List in 2004; in late 2006, the magazine Blender listed her as one of the hottest women of film and TV. In May 2007, she was featured as one of 100 Most Beautiful in a People special edition. TV Guide included her and Ellen DeGeneres in their Power A-List couples in 2007.

In February 2012, it was announced that ABC had ordered a pilot for a new drama series The Smart One, one of whose executive producers was Ellen DeGeneres, and which featured de Rossi in a leading role. The actress was to star as a "brilliant and successful woman who begrudgingly goes to work for her less-brainy but more popular sister – a former beauty queen, weather girl and now big-city Mayor." But The Smart One was not picked up for the 2012–2013 season.

Six years after the series was canceled by Fox, filming for a revived fourth season of Arrested Development began in August 2012, and de Rossi reprised her role as Lindsay Bluth Fünke. This fourth season consisted of 15 new episodes, which debuted on Netflix on 26 May 2013. Each episode focused on one particular character, with de Rossi's Lindsay featured in Episode 3, "Indian Takers", and Episode 8, "Red Hairing", and also appearing in several other episodes of the season.

In July 2014, ABC confirmed that de Rossi was joining season 4 of Scandal, in the role of Elizabeth North. Her recurring role was upgraded to a series regular for the fifth season. In April 2017, in season six, de Rossi's character was killed off in a golf club attack. De Rossi herself made the decision to depart the series.

In May 2018, de Rossi announced on The Ellen DeGeneres Show that she would be retiring from acting, though she later elaborated that she would make an exception for future seasons of Arrested Development.Portia de Rossi Talks What's Next After Acting

 Personal life 

De Rossi was married to documentary filmmaker Mel Metcalfe from 1996 to 1999, initially part of a plan to get a green card, though she did not go through with the plan. She said about the marriage that "it just obviously wasn't right for me." In a 2010 interview on Good Morning America, she said that as a young actress, she was fearful of being exposed as a lesbian.

From 2001 to 2004, de Rossi dated director Francesca Gregorini, the daughter of Barbara Bach and the stepdaughter of Ringo Starr. She said that most of her family and Ally McBeal castmates did not know she was a lesbian until tabloid pictures of the couple were published. She declined to publicly discuss the relationship or her sexual orientation at the time.

De Rossi and Gregorini broke up in late 2004 because de Rossi began dating DeGeneres, whom she met backstage at an awards show. In 2005, she opened up publicly about her sexual orientation in interviews with Details and The Advocate. She and DeGeneres became engaged when DeGeneres proposed in 2008. They were married at their Beverly Hills home on 16 August 2008, witnessed by their mothers and 17 other guests. On 6 August 2010, de Rossi filed a petition to legally change her name to Portia Lee James DeGeneres. The petition was granted on 23 September 2010. She became a United States citizen in September 2011.

In 2010, de Rossi published her autobiography, titled Unbearable Lightness: A Story of Loss and Gain, within which she wrote about the turmoil that she had experienced in her life, including suffering from anorexia nervosa and bulimia and being misdiagnosed with lupus. She had struggled with the eating disorders for four years while filming Ally McBeal. To promote the book, she appeared on The Oprah Winfrey Show and The Ellen DeGeneres Show.''

DeGeneres and de Rossi both became vegans in 2008, though DeGeneres said in December 2018 that she is no longer vegan. The couple have adopted several rescue animals.

In 2017, de Rossi tweeted that actor Steven Seagal had exposed himself to her while she was auditioning for one of his films.

Philanthropy 
De Rossi supports a variety of charitable organizations, including Locks of Love, a group that provides human hair wigs for children with alopecia and other medical conditions that cause hair loss.

She has also supported fundraising efforts for FXB International, an African AIDS relief organization, and The Art of Elysium, an art foundation for terminally ill children. De Rossi also supports Alley Cat Allies, an organization dedicated to protecting and improving the lives of cats. De Rossi and DeGeneres are supporters of The Gentle Barn, a California sanctuary for abused animals.

Filmography

Film

Television

Awards and nominations

References

External links 

 
 

1973 births
Living people
20th-century Australian actresses
21st-century American actresses
21st-century American non-fiction writers
21st-century Australian actresses
21st-century American women writers
Actresses from Victoria (Australia)
American autobiographers
American film actresses
American television actresses
American lesbian actresses
American lesbian writers
Australian lesbian actresses
Australian lesbian writers
Australian autobiographers
Australian expatriate actresses in the United States
Australian film actresses
Australian emigrants to the United States
Australian television actresses
Lesbian memoirists
LGBT people from California
People from Geelong
Writers from California
Writers from Victoria (Australia)
Women autobiographers
People from Horsham, Victoria
People with acquired American citizenship
American women non-fiction writers
People educated at Melbourne Girls Grammar
American women chief executives
Actresses from Geelong
Actors from Geelong